Thomas Staller was an English Anglican priest.

Staller educated at the University of Oxford. He was Chaplain to Archbishop Matthew Parker and held the living at St Mary-at-Hill in the City of London. He was Archdeacon of Rochester from 1593 until his death in 1606.

Notes

16th-century English Anglican priests
17th-century English Anglican priests
Archdeacons of Rochester
Alumni of the University of Oxford
1606 deaths